Comedy Quiz was a radio programme that aired from July 1996 to December 1997.  There were 12 half-hour episodes and it was broadcast on BBC Radio 4.  It starred Pam Ayres, Bernard Cribbins, and Jim Bowen.

References 
 Lavalie, John. Comedy Quiz. EpGuides. 21 July 2005. 29 July 2005  <http://epguides.com/ComedyQuiz/>.

BBC Radio 4 programmes
1996 radio programme debuts